This is a list of prayers
for various religions.

Christian prayers

Common to several denominations 
Apostles' Creed
Compline
Epiclesis
Glory Be to the Father
Good Friday Prayer
Grace at Meals, including some non-Christian versions
Litany
Lord's Prayer
Magnificat (Song of Mary)
Nicene Creed
Prayer for the dead
Serenity Prayer
Trinitarian formula
Vespers
Vigil

Catholic prayers 
Angelus
Compline
Confiteor
Liturgy of the Hours
Hail Mary
Magnificat (Song of Mary)
Make Me an Instrument of Your Peace
Mass
Memorare
Morning Prayers
Nicene Creed
Prayer to St. Michael the Archangel
Rosary
Vespers
Des and Troy

Triduum Marian 
 Act of Contrition
 Prayer for all Sorts and Conditions
 For General Thanksgiving

Eastern Orthodox prayers 
Christian prayers specific to the Eastern Orthodox Church and those Eastern Catholic Churches which follow the Byzantine Rite:
Jesus Prayer
Akathist
Axion Estin
Theotokion
Ektenia

Other denominations 
Wesley Covenant Prayer (Methodist)
Daily Prayer for Peace (Community of Christ)

Prayers of the Theotokos ("Mary, Mother of God") 

It Is Truly Meet
O Virgin Pure

Islamic prayers 

Salaah, ritual Islamic prayer, prescribed five times daily:
Fajr – the dawn prayer. It is a two Rakat Salaah.
Dhuhr – the early afternoon prayer. It is a four Rakat Salaah.
Asr – the late afternoon prayer. It is a four Rakat Salaah.
Maghrib – the sunset prayer. It is a three Rakat Salaah.
Isha'a – the night prayer. It is a four Rakat Salaah.
Besides the five daily prayers, other notable forms of salaah include:
Jumu'ah – weekly congregational prayer (replaces dhuhr on Fridays two rakat along with khutba)
 Sunnah - These prayers are recommended to be performed as by the Prophet on a regular basis throughout the lifetime; missing once or twice so that it does not become fard is called Sunnat.
2 Rak'ats Sunnat for Fajr. (The Fajr sunnat is offered before Fajr prayers, and Duha prayer after sunrise.)
6 Rak'ats Sunnat for Zuhr. (The Zuhr sunnat is 4 rakats before Zuhr and 2 rakats after zuhur.)
2 Rak'ats Sunnat for Maghrib. (The sunnat for maghrib should be offered after Maghrib prayers.)
2 Rak'ats Sunnat for Isha. (The sunnat for Isha is 2 rakat after Isha and another 2 rakat named Chafa'a and followed by 1 rakat of Witr.)
However, there is no Sunnat for Asr
Nafil Salaah
Salaat al-Layl
Salat of Ja’far e Tayyar (as) - The best time to perform it is on Friday before noon. It is four Rakat Salat, divided into two parts 2 x 2 rakat.
Salaat -e-Gufaila - Ghufayla prayers is one of the Mustahab prayers which is offered between Maghrib and Isha prayers.
Namaz/Salaat of Eid/festival
Eid Salaah – performed during the two primary Islamic festivals, Eid al-Fitr and Eid al-Adha
Tarawih – lengthy night-time prayers during Ramadan

 Dua, or "supplication"
 Dhikr, or "remembrance of God", often involving various repeated phrases, most notably:
 Subhanallah
 Alhamdulillah
 Allahu akbar – see takbir
 La ilaha ill Allah – see Six Kalimas
 Astaghfirullah

Hindu prayers 
 Prayer or worship is considered to be an integral part of the Hindu religion. The chanting of mantras is the most popular form of worship in Hinduism. Yoga and meditation are also considered as a form of devotional service. The adjacent picture represents the Om sign, which is a sacred sound and a spiritual symbol in Hinduism.

The Vedas are a collection of liturgy (mantras, hymns). Stuti is a general term for devotional literary compositions, but literally means praise.

The Hindu devotional Bhakti movements emphasizes repetitive prayer. Stemming from the universal Soul or Brahman, prayer is focused on the personal forms of Devas and/or Devis, such as Vishnu, or Vishnu's Avatars, Rama and Krishna, shiva as well as Shakti, or Shakti's forms such as Lakshmi or Kali. Ganesha is also a popular deity in Bhakti.

Before the process of ritual, before the invoking of different deities for the fulfillment of various needs, came the human aspiration to the highest truth, the foundational monism of Hinduism, pertaining ultimately to the one Brahman. Brahman, which summarily can be called the unknowable, true, infinite and blissful Divine Ground, is the source and being of all existence from which the cosmos springs. This is the essence of the Vedic system. The following prayer was part and parcel of all the Vedic ceremonies and continues to be invoked even today in Hindu temples all over India and other countries around the world, and exemplifies this essence.

Jain prayers 
 Namokar Mantra
 Bhaktamara Stotra
 Uvasagharam Stotra

Jewish prayers 

List of Jewish Prayers and Blessings
 Tefillah prayers prescribed 3 times a day by observant Jews and 4 times a day during every Shabbat service:
 Shacharit - Dawn/Morning prayer
 Mincha - Afternoon prayer
 Maariv - Evening prayer
 Mussaf - Additional prayer that is recited on Shabbat, Yom Tov, Chol Hamoed, and Rosh Chodesh.
Shema Yisrael
V'ahavta
Amidah
Kaddish
Kol Nidre
Aleinu
Selichot
Ne'ila
Berakhah (Jewish blessings) According to Jewish tradition, religious Jews are required to recite 100 berakhot (blessings) each day.

Sikh prayers
The Sikhs believe in going to bed early, then waking up early the next morning. The Sikhs call early morning as Amrit wela. Most of the Sikhs (especially baptized) wake up at this time of day and pray

Morning prayers
 
In the morning most of the Sikhs recite the path by sitting in their family or sitting alone. They recite 5 paths (holy chapters) as directed by the tenth guru of Sikhs Sri Guru Gobind Singh.
 
The list of 5 paths is:
Japji Sahib
Jaap Sahib
Tav Prasad Savaiye
Chaupai Sahib
Anand Sahib
They try to perform these prayers on a daily basis.

Evening prayers
In the evening the Sikhs perform the path of Rehraas Sahib.

Night prayers
During night time the Sikhs recite Kirtan Sohila before sleeping.
 
Though the Sikhs pray these special prayers they are always in touch with their God by reciting Waheguru for the whole day, follow the orders of their Guru Nanak Dev Ji to do work but keep their attention towards God.

References 

list
Prayers